Dundraw is a civil parish in the Borough of Allerdale in Cumbria, England.  It contains six listed buildings that are recorded in the National Heritage List for England.  All the listed buildings are designated at Grade II, the lowest of the three grades, which is applied to "buildings of national importance and special interest".  The parish, apart from small settlements, is entirely rural.  All the listed buildings are farmhouses and farm buildings. 


Buildings

References

Citations

Sources

Lists of listed buildings in Cumbria